S. Lochlann Jain is an author and artist, in addition to being a Professor in the Anthropology Department at Stanford University, where they teach medical and legal anthropology, and a Visiting Professor of Social Medicine in the Department of Global Health and Social Medicine at King's College London.

Education
Jain completed a BA at McGill University, an MPhil at the University of Glasgow, a PhD in the History of Consciousness Program at the University of California Santa Cruz, and a Post-Doc at the University of British Columbia.

Books and research
Jain is the author of the book Injury, a political analysis of the history of injury law in the United States. Jain's second book, Malignant: How Cancer Becomes Us offers an analysis of cancer as an all-encompassing aspect of American culture. It was described in Nature Magazine as being "brilliant and disturbing" and was widely reviewed. Jain developed the concept of "living in prognosis" to name and better understand the role of statistics in constituting the paradoxes of living with and in cancer. Malignant was awarded numerous prizes, including the Victor Turner Prize for Ethnographic Writing, The Staley Prize, The June Roth Prize for medical writing, the Edelstein Prize, the Diana Forsythe Prize. Jain's third book, Things that Art: A Graphic Menagerie of Enchanting Curiosity, deconstructs the work done by categories through a series of drawings and essays.

Books 
Things That Art, University of Toronto Press, 2019.
Malignant: How Cancer Becomes Us. University of California Press, 2013
 Injury: The Politics of Product Design and Safety Law in the United States, Princeton University Press. 2006

References

External links

 Stanford University Faculty Page for S. Lochlann  Jain
  Malignant: How Cancer Becomes Us book website.
 

American anthropologists
Historians of science
Living people
American Jains
Medical anthropologists
American academics of Indian descent
Year of birth missing (living people)